Georges Akieremy Owondo (born 15 September 1983 in Gabon) is a retired Gabonese football striker.

International career
Akiremy is a member of the Gabon national football team. He scored a goal against Madagascar in an African Nations Cup qualifier on 17 June 2007.

International goals
Scores and results list Gabon's goal tally first.

Honours
 Georgian League
2007–08
 Georgian Super Cup
2008
Liga Leumit
2010–11
Toto Cup Leumit
2010–11

References

External links

1983 births
Living people
Gabonese footballers
Gabon international footballers
Gabonese expatriate sportspeople in Georgia (country)
Association football forwards
Gabonese expatriate sportspeople in Angola
Expatriate footballers in Angola
FC Dinamo Tbilisi players
Expatriate footballers in Georgia (country)
Gabonese expatriate sportspeople in Portugal
21st-century Gabonese people